5E or 5-E can refer to:

5°E, or 5th meridian east, a longitude coordinate
5e, a type of Category 5 cable 
5E, a learning cycle developed by Biological Sciences Curriculum Study.
Astra 5°E, a communications satellite
Dungeons & Dragons 5th edition, a fantasy tabletop role-playing game (RPG) released in 2014.
F-5E, a model of Northrop F-5 jet
Five Eyes, an espionage alliance between the US, UK, NZ, Canada, and Australia.
Tropical Depression Five-E (2008)
SGA Airlines (IATA airline code)
5E, the production code for the 1978–79 Doctor Who serial The Power of Kroll

See also
E5 (disambiguation)